Stanleya neritinoides is a species of freshwater snail, an aquatic gastropod mollusk in the family Paludomidae.

Stanleya neritinoides is probably the only species in the genus Stanleya. The genus Stanleya may be closely related to the genus Tanganyicia.

This species was listed as Endangered in the 2006 IUCN Red List.

Distribution 
This species is found in Burundi, the Democratic Republic of the Congo, Tanzania, and Zambia.

The type locality is Lake Tanganyika.

Description 

References

External links
 Smith E. A. (1881). "On a collection of shells from lakes Tanganyika and Nyassa and other localities in East Africa". Proceedings of the Zoological Society of London 1881: 276-300. Plate 33, figure 19.
 Strong E. E. & Glaubrecht M. (2003). "Anatomy and systematic affinity of Stanleya neritinoides (Smith, 1880), an enigmatic member of the thalassoid gastropod species flock in Lake Tanganyika, East Africa (Cerithioidea, Paludomidae)". Acta Zoologica 84(4): 249-265. .
 Bourguignat, J.-R. (1885). Notice prodromique sur les mollusques terrestres et fluviatiles recueillis par M. Victor Giraud dans la région méridionale du lac Tanganyika. 110 pp. Paris

Paludomidae
Gastropods described in 1880
Taxonomy articles created by Polbot
Snails of Lake Tanganyika